B-Side is a compilation album by Mr. Children, released on May 10, 2007, marking the fifteenth anniversary of their first album's release. It collects all of the group's B-sides, with a booklet providing liner notes for each of them.

A promotional video was created for the song  to promote this compilation.

Track listing

Disc one
  - 4:08
 my confidence song - 1:55
  - 9:39
  - 5:09
  - 4:07
 Love is Blindness - 3:29
  - 3:23
  - 5:28
  - 3:32
 Heavenly kiss - 6:08
  - 5:52

Disc two
  - 7:43
  5:32
  - 6:30
 I'm sorry - 4:25
  - 3:04
  - 3:54
  - 3:04
 my sweet heart - 3:16
  - 3:17
  - 5:42
  - 6:49

Mr. Children albums
B-side compilation albums
2007 compilation albums